Krutiki is a rural locality (a village) in Vereshchaginsky District, Perm Krai, Russia. The population was 21 as of 2010.

Geography 
Krutiki is located 18 km east of Vereshchagino (the district's administrative centre) by road. Kukety is the nearest rural locality.

References 

Rural localities in Vereshchaginsky District